Nadym Airport  is an airport in Yamalo-Nenets Autonomous Okrug, Russia located  southeast of Nadym. It handles large airliners (including Ilyushin Il-62 and Ilyushin Il-86 aircraft). 186,769 passengers traveled to and from this airport in 2018.

Airlines and destinations

See also

References

External links

Nadym Airport Website 

Airports built in the Soviet Union
Airports in Yamalo-Nenets Autonomous Okrug